State leaders in the 19th century BC – State leaders in the 17th century BC – State leaders by year
This is a list of state leaders in the 18th century BC (1800–1701 BC).

Africa: Northeast

Egypt: Second Intermediate Period

Thirteenth Dynasty of the Second Intermediate Period (complete list) –
Sonbef, King (1800/1799–1796/1795 BC)
Nerikare, King (1796 BC)
Sekhemkare, King (1796–1793 BC)
Ameny Qemau, King (1793–1791 BC)
Hotepibre, King (1791–1788 BC)
Iufni, King (c.1788 BC)
Amenemhet VI, King (1788–1785 BC)
Semenkare Nebnuni, King (1785–1783 BC)
Sehetepibre, King (1783–1781 BC)
Sewadjkare, King (c.1781 BC)
Nedjemibre, King (c.1780 BC)
Khaankhre Sobekhotep, King (c.1735 BC)
Renseneb, King (c.1777 BC)
Hor, King  (1777–1775 BC)
Sekhemrekhutawy Khabaw, King (1775–1772 BC)
Djedkheperew, King (1772–1770 BC)
Sebkay, King (c.1770 BC)
Sedjefakare, King (1770–1765 BC)
Wegaf, King (1794–1757 BC)
Khendjer, King (1764–1759 BC)
Imyremeshaw, King (1759 BC–?)
Sehetepkare Intef, King (c.1754 BC)
Seth Meribre, King (?–1749 BC)
Sobekhotep III, King (c.1740 BC)
Neferhotep I, King (c.1742–1733 BC)
Sihathor, Coregent King (with Neferhotep I)
Sobekhotep IV, King (c.1728 BC)
Merhotepre Sobekhotep, King (c.1721 BC)
Sobekhotep VI, King (1719–1715 BC)
Wahibre Ibiau, King (c.1714–1702 BC)
Merneferre Ay, King (c.1701–1677 BC)

Fourteenth Dynasty of the Second Intermediate Period (complete list) –
Yakbim Sekhaenre, King (1805–1780 BC)
Ya'ammu Nubwoserre, King (1780–1770 BC)
Qareh, King (1770–1760 BC)
Aahotepre, King (late-18th century BC)
Sheshi, King (late-18th century BC)
Nehesy, King (c.1705 BC)
Khakherewre, King (c.1705 BC)
Nebefawre, King (c.1704 BC)
Sehebre, King (c.1704–1699)

Asia

Asia: East 

China

Asia: Southeast
Vietnam
Hồng Bàng dynasty (complete list) –
Tốn line, (c.1912–c.1713 BC)
Ly line, (c.1712–c.1632 BC)

Asia: West

Assyria: Old Period

Babylonia

Ebla

Elam

References 

State Leaders
-
18th-century BC rulers